Pournami may refer to:

Pournami (film), a 2006 Indian Telugu-language film
Pournami (TV series), a 2018–2021 Indian Telugu-language soap opera

See also
Starring Pournami, an unreleased Indian Malayalam-language film
 Purnima (disambiguation)